Gaotangling Subdistrict is a subdistrict and the seat of Wangcheng District in Changsha, Hunan Province, China. It is located on the western bank of the Xiang river, also the lower reaches of Wei river, a tributary of the Xiang. The subdistrict is bordered by Jinggang Town to the north, Shuangjiangkou to the west, Wushan to the southwest, Tongguan across the Xiang river to the east.

History
The Gaotangling Subdistrict was reformed by merging of the former Gaotangling Subdistrict and Xingkang township on November 19, 2015.

Pre-Gaotangling
Gaotangling was a portion of Rende township of Changsha county in 1949; Gaotangling commune was formed In 1959. Chengguan town was formed from a portion of Gaotangling commune In 1979; Gaotangling commune was renamed Gaotangling township in 1983. Gaotangling township was merged to Chengguan town in 1985; Chengguan town was renamed Gaotangling town in 1995. Gaotangling town contained 10 residential communities and 10 villages in 1995.

According to 2010 census, there was a population of  72,171. Gaotangling town was renamed Gaotangling Subdistrict in June 2012.
 It contained nine residential communities and four villages, and covered  with a population of 98.9 thonsand.

On August 28, 2012, Gaotangling Subdistrict was divided into Gaotangling and Yujiapo two subdistricts. Gaotangling covered  with six residential communities under its jurisdiction. Yujiapo had  with three residential communities under its jurisdiction. The Yujiapo Subdistrict was merged to Wushan on November 19, 2015.

On November 19, 2015, Xinkang township was merged to the Gaotangling Subdistrict.

Xinkang township 
The former Xinkang township was the place of Xinkang township of Changsha county in 1949. It was divided into Tuojiang and Sihe townships in 1951. The place was merged to Jinggang Commune in 1958, and was reformed as a commune from a portion of Jinggang in 1961. It was renamed as a township in 1984.

Subdivision
The former Gaotangling Subdistrict and Xinkang township was merged to Gaotangling on November 19, 2015. On March 23, 2016, Xinkangjizhen residential community and Tanjiayuan village were merged as Xinkang residential community; Xingwang and Heyi were merged as Mingsheng village; the subdistrict has 10 residential communities nine villages under its jurisdiction.

Subdivisions at merging in 2015
The former Gaotangling Subdistrict and Xinkang township was merged to Gaotangling on November 19, 2015; at that time there were 10 residential communities and 11 villages.

Subdivision of pre-Gaotangling before 2015
Gaotangling Subdistrict was divided into Gaotangling and Yujiapo on August 28, 2012, the Gaotangling Subdistrict had six residential communities and four villages; the Yujiapo subdistrict had three residential communities.

Gaotangling contained 10 residential communities and 10 villages in 1995.

References

Township-level divisions of Wangcheng
Wangcheng
County seats in Hunan